Mount Glorious is a rural locality in the Moreton Bay Region, Queensland, Australia.

Geography
Mount Glorious is a mountain which is part of the D'Aguilar Range and is a suburb in Moreton Bay Region. The forest that surrounds the mountain village is part of Brisbane Forest Park and the D'Aguilar National Park. 

The locality has the following mountains (from north to south):

 Mount Samson 
 Mount D'Aguilar 
 Mount Glorious 

Other mountains in the D'Aguilar Range (but not in the this locality) include Mount Nebo, Mount Pleasant and Mount Mee.

History 
The locality name takes its name from the mountain, which was named as the result of a random remark by Elizabeth Patrick at a 1915 picnic, when she commented on the view.

Five blocks on the mountain were made available early in the 20th century, with the first block being bought by James O'Hara in 1903. In 1921, a real estate map advertised 31 blocks as 'Crest Estate : the first section', being subdivisions of Portion 9, Parish of Parker.

The mountain was the centre of a 4.4 magnitude earthquake in November 1960.

The median age of the Mount Glorious population was 49 years, 11 years above the national median of 38.  69.4% of people living in Mount Glorious were born in Australia. The other top responses for country of birth were England 9.3%, New Zealand 4.5%, Netherlands 1.0%, Italy 1.0% and India 1.0%. 88.0% of people spoke only English at home; the next most common languages were Dutch 1.0%, and Sinhalese 1.0%

Education 
There are no schools in Mount Glorious. The nearest government primary schools are Mount Samson State School in neighbouring Mount Samson to the north-east and Mount Nebo State School in neighbouring Mount Nebo to the south. The nearest government secondary school is Ferny Grove State High School in Ferny Grove to the south-east.

Amenities 
The Moreton Bay Regional Council operates a mobile library service which visits the Mount Glorious Hall on Mount Glorious Road.

See also

 List of mountains in Australia

References

External links

 Mount Glorious - Website about Mount Glorious

Glorious
Suburbs of Moreton Bay Region
Localities in Queensland